Robert A. Durand (born February 28, 1953, in Marlborough, Massachusetts) is an American politician who served as the Secretary of Environmental Affairs in the Commonwealth of Massachusetts from 1999 to 2003.

Career 
Prior to becoming Secretary of Environmental Affairs, Durand represented the Middlesex and Worcester District in the Massachusetts Senate (1991–99) and the 4th Middlesex district in the Massachusetts House of Representatives from (1985–91).

References

1953 births
Massachusetts Secretaries of Environmental Affairs
Democratic Party Massachusetts state senators
Democratic Party members of the Massachusetts House of Representatives
People from Marlborough, Massachusetts
Boston College alumni
Living people